Coptoclavidae is an extinct family of aquatic beetles in the suborder Adephaga. The Coptoclavidae lived from the Late Triassic to the Early Cretaceous. Coptoclavidae is a member of the adephagan clade Dytiscoidea, which contains other aquatic beetles. Suggested reasons for their extinction to include the rise of teleost fish, or competition with Gyrinidae and Dytiscidae, which possess defensive secretions and sucking channels in the mandibles of larvae, which coptoclavids likely lacked. It has been suggested that the genus Timarchopsis and the subfamily Timarchopsinae are only distantly related to other coptoclavids based on cladistic analysis, with Timarchopsis being more closely related to geadephagans like carabids and trachypachids instead. Another study also suggested similarly for Coptoclavisca and possibly other coptoclaviscines.

Taxonomy 

 †Agrascapha Lin 1992 Huangshanjie Formation, China, Carnian
 †Amblycephalonius Bode 1953 Posidonia Shale, Germany, Toarcian
 †subfamily Charonoscaphinae Ponomarenko 1977
 †Charonoscapha Ponomarenko 1977 Karabastau Formation, Kazakhstan, Callovian
 †Charonoscaphidia Ponomarenko 1977  Karabastau Formation, Kazakhstan, Callovian
 †Coptoclavia Ping 1928 Cassange Group, Upper Triassic
 †subfamily Coptoclavinae Ponomarenko 1961
 †Bolbonectes Ponomarenko 1987  
 †Bolbonectes intermedius Ponomarenko 1987 Byankino Formation, Russia, Tithonian Leskovskaya Formation, Russia, Barremian
 †Bolbonectes occidentalis Ponomarenko 1993 Ichetuy Formation, Russia, Oxfordian
 †Bolbonectus lithographicus Ponomarenko and Martínez-Delclòs 2000 La Pedrera de Rúbies Formation, Spain, Barremian
 †Coptoclava Ping 1928 Ustkarskaya Formation, Russia, Hauterivian Dabeigou Formation, China, Hauterivian, Kutinskaya Formation, Russia, Barremian Dalazi Formation, Laiyang Formation, Jianchang Formation, Shouchang Formation, Jiufotang Formation, Chijinbao Formation, Aptian Zaza Formation, Gidarinskaya Formation, Mangutskaya Formation, Turga Formation, Russia, Aptian
 †Hoyaclava Soriano et al. 2007 Las Hoyas, Spain, Barremian
 †Megacoptoclava Ponomarenko and Martínez-Delclòs 2000 Las Hoyas, Spain, Barremian
 †subfamily Coptoclaviscinae Soriano et al. 2007
 †Coptoclavella Ponomarenko 1980
 †Coptoclavella elegans Ponomarenko 1980 Mogotuin Formation, Mongolia, Aptian
 †Coptoclavella inexpecta Soriano et al. 2007 La Pedrera de Rúbies Formation, Spain, Barremian
 †Coptoclavella jurassica Ponomarenko 2014 Sharteg, Mongolia, Tithonian
 †Coptoclavella minor Ponomarenko 1980 Takshin Formation, Kalgan Formation Russia, Callovian, Daya Formation, Russia, Hauterivian Mogotuin Formation, Mongolia, Aptian Turga Formation, Russia, Aptian
 †Coptoclavella purbeckensis Ponomarenko et al. 2005, Durlston Formation, United Kingdom, Berriasian
 †Coptoclavella vittata Ponomarenko 1986 Gurvan-Eren Formation, Mongolia, Aptian
 †Coptoclavella striata Ponomarenko 1986 Gurvan-Eren Formation, Mongolia, Aptian
 †Coptoclavisca Ponomarenko 1987 Laiyang Formation, China, Aptian Tsagaantsav Formation, Mongolia, Early Cretaceous
 †Stargelytron Ponomarenko 2015 Röt Formation, Germany, Anisian, Hassberge Formation, Germany, Carnian
 †Euroscapha Lin 1992  Huangshanjie Formation, China, Carnian
 †Holcoptera Handlirsch 1906
 †Holcoptera alisonae Kelly et al. 2017 Charmouth Mudstone Formation, United Kingdom, Sinemurian
 †Holcoptera giebeli Handlirsch 1906 Lilstock Formation, United Kingdom, Rhaetian,  Charmouth Mudstone Formation, United Kingdom, Sinemurian,
 †Holcoptera pigmentatus Kelly et al. 2017 Lilstock Formation, United Kingdom, Rhaetian Portland Formation, Connecticut, Hettangian Mount Toby Formation, Massachusetts, Hettangian
 †Holcoptera schlotheimi Giebel 1856 (=Holcoptera confluens Cockerell 1915) Argilliti di Riva di Solto Formation, Italy, Norian, Lilstock Formation, United Kingdom, Rhaetian, Blue Lias, United Kingdom, Hettangian, Portland Formation, Connecticut, Hettangian
 †Holcoptera solitensis Kelly et al. 2017 Cow Branch Formation, North Carolina, Norian
 †subfamily Hispanoclavinae Soriano et al. 2007
 †Hispanoclavina Soriano et al. 2007 Las Hoyas, Spain, Barremian
 †subfamily Timarchopsinae Wang et al. 2010
 †Actea Germar 1842 Solnhofen, Germany, Tithonian
 †Daohugounectes Wang et al. 2009 Daohugou, China, Callovian
 †Ditomoptera Germar 1839 Solnhofen, Germany, Tithonian
 †Exedia Ponomarenko 1977 Karabastau Formation, Kazakhstan, Callovian
 †Ovonectes Soriano et al. 2007 Las Hoyas, Spain, Barremian
 †Protonectes Prokin and Ponomarenko 2013 Hassberge Formation, Germany, Carnian
 †Pseudohydrophilus Deichmüller 1886 Solnhofen, Germany, Tithonian
 †Stygeonectes Ponomarenko 1977 Cheremkhovskaya Formation, Russia, Toarcian, Udinskaya Formation, Russia, Callovian, Uda Formation, Ichetuy Formation, Russia, Oxfordian, Glushkovo Formation, Russia, Tithonian Leskovskaya Formation, Bukachacha Formation, Russia, Barremian, Godymboyskaya Formation, Turga Formation, Russia, Aptian
 †Timarchopsis Brauer et al. 1889
 †Timarchopsis aquaticus Ponomarenko 1977 Cheremkhovskaya Formation, Russia, Toarcian, Ichetuy Formation, Russia, Oxfordian
 †Timarchopsis cyrenaicus Ponomarenko 1977 Algeria, Hauterivian
 †Timarchopsis czekanowskii Brauer et al. 1889 Cheremkhovskaya Formation, Russia, Toarcian
 †Timarchopsis gigas Ponomarenko 1977 Karabastau Formation, Kazakhstan, Callovian
 †Timarchopsis gobiensis Ponomarenko 1987 Ulaan-Ereg Formation, Mongolia, Tithonian
 †Timarchopsis latus Ponomarenko 1977 Sagul Formation, Kyrgyzstan, Toarcian
 †Timarchopsis longus Ponomarenko 2014 Sharteg, Mongolia, Tithonian
 †Timarchopsis mongolicus Ponomarenko 1985 Zhargalant Formation, Mongolia, Bathonian
 †Timarchopsis sainshandensis Ponomarenko 1987 Khamarkhoburinskaya Formation, Mongolia, Aalenian
 †Tuhanectes Hong 1995 Sanjianfang Formation, China, Bathonian

References 

 
Prehistoric beetles
†
Jurassic first appearances
Early Cretaceous extinctions